The Sekhukhune Anti-Aircraft Regiment (formerly 6 Light Anti-Aircraft Regiment) is an air defence regiment of the South African Army. It is part of the South African Army Air Defence Artillery Formation. It is located in Johannesburg.

History
6 Light Anti-Aircraft Regiment was officially established on 1 April 1965 with its headquarters in Brakpan at the headquarters of Regiment Oos Transvaal until 1968.
It transferred to Springs, and then moved to Johannesburg in 1979.

The first commanding officer was Commandant Dick Inngs, who retired in 1977. He was succeeded by Commandant Nick Irish.

Border War
The regiment took part in Operation Savannah in 1976 as part of 73 Brigade, part of 7 South African Infantry Division. Two batteries of 35mm Oerlikon GDF AA guns were mobilised for duty on the SWA border to protect Grootfontein and Rundu.

Freedom of Entry
The unit exercised its freedom of entry into Johannesburg on the 9th of November 2013 as part of the centenary celebrations of the City of Johannesburg with
fixed bayonets, colours flying and drums beating.

Name Change
In August 2019, 52 Reserve Force units had their names changed to reflect the diverse military history of South Africa. 6 Light Anti-Aircraft Regiment became the Sekhukhune Anti-Aircraft Regiment, and have 3 years to design and implement new regimental insignia.

Regimental Symbols

Battle Honours
 Operation Savannah

References

Artillery regiments of South Africa
Air defence regiments
Military units and formations in Brakpan
Military units and formations established in 2019